Rareform is the second studio album by American progressive metal band After the Burial. It was released on July 22, 2008 through Sumerian Records.

Reissue
On September 15, 2009, the band released a re-mixed and re-mastered version of Rareform with alternative artwork and bonus features. The vocals on the reissue were re-recorded with the band's current vocalist, Anthony Notormaso (in contrast to Grant Luoma, who performed lead vocals for the original version of Rareform). Contrary to popular belief, the drums were not actually re-recorded by Dan Carle live and were still programmed for the reissue of the album, albeit remixed extensively. Both editions of the album were produced by the band's rhythm guitarist, Justin Lowe.

Track listing

Personnel
After the Burial
Trent Hafdahl – lead guitar, backing vocals
Justin Lowe – rhythm guitar, drums, programming
Lerichard "Lee" Foral – bass
Grant Luoma – lead vocals (original release)
Anthony Notarmaso – lead vocals (2009 reissue version)

Additional musicians
Alex Haza – guest vocals on track 2
Matthew Downs – guest vocals on track 3

Additional personnel
Trent Hafdahl – production, engineering
Justin Lowe – production, mixing
Mark Softich – mixing, mastering
Shawn Keith – A&R
Damagework – artwork

References

External links
 Rareform at Sumerian Records

Sumerian Records albums
After the Burial albums
2008 albums
2009 albums